WUMC (90.5 FM, "Milligan College Radio") is a radio station broadcasting a college format. Licensed to Elizabethton, Tennessee, United States, it serves the Tri-Cities TN / VA area.  The station is owned by Milligan College.

External links
 WUMC official website
 

UMC
UMC